Meshir 9 - Coptic Calendar - Meshir 11

The tenth day of the Coptic month of Meshir, the sixth month of the Coptic year. In common years, this day corresponds to February 4, of the Julian Calendar, and February 17, of the Gregorian Calendar. This day falls in the Coptic Season of Shemu, the season of the Harvest.

Commemorations

Apostles 

 The martyrdom of Saint James the Apostle, the Son of Alphaeus

Martyrs 

 The martyrdom of Saint Philo, Bishop of the Persians  
 The martyrdom of Saint Justus, the son of Emperor Numerian

Saints 

 The departure of Saint Isidore of Pelusium

References 

Days of the Coptic calendar